Fred Sweet was an American college football coach. He served as the head coach at Tulane University in 1894. Tulane recorded a 0–4 record that season.

Head coaching record

References

Year of birth missing
Year of death missing
Tulane Green Wave football coaches